is a shopping mall in Saiwai-ku, Kawasaki, Japan. The mall adjoins the west side Kawasaki Station. It is the largest commercial facility in the Mitsui Fudosan affiliate and has the highest sales volume.

Structure
The design is by Ricardo Bofill Taller de Arquitectura, and makes use of natural lighting. There is a branch shrine of Izumo-taisha on the flat roof of a building.

History
Between 1908 and 2000, the lot was occupied by a Toshiba factory. Construction of Lazona began in 2001. The mall opened on 28 September 2006.

On May 5, 2019, the unit BEST FRIENDS! made their first concert.

See also
 List of shopping malls in Japan
 List of works by Ricardo Bofill Taller de Arquitectura

References

External links
Official website 

2006 establishments in Japan
Shopping centres in Japan
Buildings and structures in Kawasaki, Kanagawa
Toshiba
Ricardo Bofill buildings
Shopping malls established in 2006